Service set can refer to:
 Service set (802.11 network), a particular 802.11 wireless network.
 Service set identifier, a name given to that network
 Basic Service Set, the group of devices associated to an access point
 Extended Service Set, the entire campus of a wireless network using the same identifier
 Tea service, a formal tea set.